Architectonicoidea is a superfamily of sea snails, marine gastropod mollusks in the informal group Lower Heterobranchia.

This superfamily contains the extant family Architectonicidae and also contains the extinct families Amphitomariidae and Cassianaxidae.

References 

Lower Heterobranchia
Taxa named by John Edward Gray